Wanderland (commonly referred to as Wanderland Music and Arts Festival) is an annual outdoor music and arts festival held in the Philippines organized by Karpos Multimedia. It showcases international and local live music, and art installations.

History

Wanderland was founded in 2013 by Karpos Multimedia Inc.

Pre-events
Wanderband is Wanderland's annual battle of the local independent bands. The winner and runner-up are given the chance to play live at Wanderland Music and Arts Festival. Since 2017, Wanderland launched a similar annual battle for live visual artists.

In partnership with JanSport, Jansport x Wanderland Bonfire Session is a prelude mini concert to the Wanderland Music and Arts Festival 2015 held at SM Mall of Asia by the Bay on April 12, 2015.

Wanderland 2020
Due to the COVID-19 pandemic in the Philippines, organizers announced on March 4, 2020, that the music festival would be indefinitely postponed in accordance with quarantine, mass gathering, and social distancing protocols set by the Inter-Agency Task Force for the Management of Emerging Infectious Diseases.

Wanderland 2023
After a two-year hiatus due to the COVID-19 pandemic, Karpos announced in November 2022 that they will hold Wanderland again on March 4–5, 2023, which will be billed as Wanderland: The Comeback. For the event, Karpos retained the sports and athletics theme that they initially used for Wanderland 2020.

References

External links
 Wanderland Official Website
 Wanderland Festival channel on YouTube

Festivals in Metro Manila
Music festivals in the Philippines